Epiphyas xylodes is a species of moth of the family Tortricidae. It is found in Australia, where it has been recorded from Queensland and New South Wales.

References

Epiphyas
Moths described in 1910